Stanley Wilson Jones  (1 July 1888 – 17 January 1962) was a colonial administrator. He was a cadet of Malayan Civil Service in 1911 and spent his civil service career in Federated Malay States and Straits Settlements. He was the British Resident of Selangor and Colonial Secretary of Straits Settlements.

Career

Federated Malay States
Jones entered the Malayan Civil Service as a cadet in 1911 and was as acting Assistant District Officer (Pekan) and during the First World War held similar position at Lipis. He was later being appoint the Assistant District Officer in Kuantan, Pekan and Kuala Kangsar and later District Officer in Jelebu and Kuala Lipis as well as acting District Officer in Klang and Kuantan.
In 1924, he was attached for special duty to the Federal Secretariat, Kuala Lumpur.
In 1927, he was Acting Commissioner of Trade (Johore) and in 1931 to 1932 as acting Legal Adviser (Johore).
In 1932 and 1933, he was the Acting General Adviser (Johore) and Commissioner of Lands and Mines (Johore).
In 1935, he went to Kedah as Acting British Adviser and later Acting Under-Secretary to the Federal Government.
In 1937 to 1939, he was the British Resident of Selangor.

Straits Settlements
In 1934, Jones was transferred to Singapore's Land Office as Acting Commissioner of Lands in January 1935.

In 1940, he was appointed as the new Colonial Secretary of Straits Settlements when Sir Alexander Small retired. In January 1942, he was unwillingly transferred out of Singapore to United Kingdom and was replaced by Hugh Fraser before the fall of Singapore to the Japanese Occupation.

Honours
Jones was invested with Companion of the Most Distinguished Order of St. Michael and St. George (CMG) in 1939.

Personal life
Jones was born in 1888 as the youngest son of Mr David Jones, Manchester. He married Esther Olive Hartley in 1919 and has one son and two daughters.

He was educated in Humle Grammar School in Manchester and graduated in B.A. from Manchester University.

In 1931, he was called to the Bar of the Middle Temple but never practised as a barrister.

Jones died in 1962.

References

1888 births
1962 deaths
Companions of the Order of St Michael and St George
Members of the Middle Temple
Chief Secretaries of Singapore
Administrators in British Singapore